Ingrid Thobois is a French novelist and development worker. She was born in Rouen in 1980. She has worked extensively in Afghanistan as a language teacher, and has also taken part in missions in Indonesia, Congo, Moldavia, and Central Asia.

She has written two novels, both widely praised: Le roi d’Afghanistan ne nous a pas mariés and L’Ange anatomique (2008).

References

1980 births
Writers from Rouen
21st-century French novelists
Prix du premier roman winners
French children's writers
French women children's writers
Living people
21st-century French women writers